David Sharbani (born August 16, 1920) was the former Sephardic Chief Rabbi (Gran Rabino) of Colombia. He served as the Sephardic Chief Rabbi of Colombia from the early 1950s to 1978. Following his tenure, Rabbi Sharbani moved to Miami, Florida. David Sharbani died in Miami on August 6, 1985. He was 64 years old.

Early life
 David Sharbani was born in Jerusalem, Israel, to renowned Kabbalist, Hakham Yehoshua Sharbani and Masuda Sharbani. the Sharbani family originated from Iraq and has a long line of prominent rabbinic figures. David's parents immigrated to Israel from Bagdad, Iraq in 1903. Rabbi Sharbani studied in famous Porat Yosef Yeshiva alongside many illustrious and prominent Sephardic figures.

Colombia
David Sharbani was the first Sephardic rabbi to head the first Sephardic synagogue in Bogota, Colombia in 1952. Rabbi Sharbani was connected with great Rabbinic leaders of the world including Rabbi Moshe Feinstein. 
 Rabbi Sharbani served as a support to the hostages held during the 1980 Dominican Republic Embassy siege in Bogotá in Bogota, 1980, by M-19 guerrillas.

Publications
Rabbi Sharbani published a Haggadah for Passover, containing Hebrew, Spanish and English. The Haggadah was published in 1960 and commissioned artwork from Holocaust survivor and Colombian cartoonist Peter Aldor.

References

Rabbis in South America
Colombian rabbis
1920 births
1985 deaths